The following Swaminarayan temples are located in the area of Nairobi:

 Shri Swaminarayan Mandir, Nairobi (EASS Temple)
 Shri Swaminarayan Mandir, Nairobi (SKSS Temple)

Swaminarayan temples